Bregy is a surname. Notable people with the surname include:

Björn Bregy (born 1974), Swiss kickboxer
Georges Bregy (born 1958), Swiss footballer

Swiss-language surnames